Iranarpia silacealis is a moth in the family Crambidae. It was described by Hans Georg Amsel in 1951. It is found in Iran.

References

Moths described in 1951
Scopariinae